The French submarine Hermione  was one of three s built for the French Navy during World War I.

See also 
List of submarines of France

Notes

Bibliography

 

Ships built in France
1917 ships